"You Made Me Believe in Magic" is the title of a 1977 international hit single by the Bay City Rollers, taken from their album It's a Game. The recording, a mid-tempo disco-styled pop tune featuring strings and horns, had its greatest impact in North America, where it was issued as the album's lead single in May 1977 to reach number 10 on the US Hot 100 in Billboard magazine that August. "You Made Me Believe in Magic" was the Bay City Rollers' third US Top 10 hit; the follow-up single "The Way I Feel Tonight" (#25) would mark the group's final Hot 100 appearance.

Outside the US, "You Made Me Believe in Magic" was typically issued as its parent album's second single, serving as a less successful followup to the "It's a Game" single: this was true in Australia (No. 36), Germany (No. 25), New Zealand (No. 39) and the UK (No. 34), where "You Made Me Believe in Magic" was the Bay City Rollers' twelfth and final chart hit. In Canada, however, the song enjoyed its greatest international popularity, where it peaked at number five, and ranks as the 68th greatest hit of 1977.

Chicago radio superstation WLS, which gave the song much airplay, ranked "You Made Me Believe in Magic" as the 27th most popular hit of 1977.  It reached as high as number 2 on their survey of July 30, 1977.

Track listing 
1. "You Made Me Believe in Magic" – 2:41   
2. "Dance Dance Dance" – 3:29 (US/Canada)
| "Are You Cuckoo" – 4:02 (UK)

Chart performance

Weekly charts

Year-end charts

Bed & Breakfast version 

You Made Me Believe In Magic is the debut single by German boy band Bed & Breakfast. It was released in 1995.

Music Video 
The music videos shows that the were in a cultural city and dancing at the desert.

Charts 
The song reached 68 in the GfK Entertainment charts.

Cover versions
"You Made Me Believe In Magic" was also performed on the hit comedy American Pie.

Credits
 Written by Len Boone
 Cover photo photography by Arista
 Production by Jimmy Ienner (track B)
 Production and engineering by Harry Maslin (track A)

Notes
 (P) 1977 Arista Records.

Made in Germany. 
EMI Electrola GmbH, Köln. 
Printed by Druckhaus Maack KG, 5880 Lüdenscheid.

GEMA 
LC 3484

References

External links
 Lyrics of this song
 

1977 singles
Bay City Rollers songs
1977 songs
Song recordings produced by Harry Maslin
Arista Records singles
Pop ballads